Martin Day may refer to:
 Martin Day (writer), British screenwriter and novelist 
 Martin Day (fighter), Japanese-born American mixed martial artist
 Martin Day (architect), Irish architect and builder

See also
 Martin's Day, a 1985 American drama film